Mohammad Paziraei (August 4, 1929 – March 9, 2002) was a Greco-Roman flyweight wrestler, who was born to an Iranian family living in Azerbaijan, but spent most of his life in Iran. He won a bronze medal at the 1960 Olympics and placed fifth at the 1961 and placed sixth at the 1962 World Championships.

References

1929 births
2002 deaths
Iranian Azerbaijanis
Olympic wrestlers of Iran
Wrestlers at the 1960 Summer Olympics
Iranian male sport wrestlers
Olympic bronze medalists for Iran
Olympic medalists in wrestling
Azerbaijani emigrants to Iran
Soviet emigrants to Iran
Medalists at the 1960 Summer Olympics
20th-century Iranian people